This article provides information on candidates who stood for the 1955 Australian federal election. The election was held on 10 December 1955.

By-elections, appointments and defections

By-elections and appointments
On 21 May 1955, Jim Cope (Labor) was elected to replace Tom Sheehan (Labor) as the member for Cook.
On 11 October 1955, Nancy Buttfield (Liberal) was appointed a South Australian Senator to replace George McLeay (Liberal).

Defections
In 1955, the Australian Labor Party split, with the right-wing Catholic faction forming the Australian Labor Party (Anti-Communist). This latter group included Victorian Labor MPs Tom Andrews (Darebin), Bill Bourke (Fawkner), Bill Bryson (Wills), Jack Cremean (Hoddle), Bob Joshua (Ballaarat), Stan Keon (Yarra) and Jack Mullens (Gellibrand), together with Tasmanian Labor Senator George Cole.
In 1955, Liberal Senator Agnes Robertson (Western Australia) lost preselection and defected to the Country Party.

Redistributions and seat changes
Redistributions of electoral boundaries occurred in all states.
In New South Wales, the Labor-held seats of Cook and Martin were abolished, and the notionally Labor seat of Hughes was created. The Country-held seat of Lawson became notionally Labor.
The member for Cook, Jim Cope (Labor), contested Watson.
The member for Martin, William O'Connor (Labor), contested Dalley.
The member for Watson, Dan Curtin (Labor), contested Kingsford-Smith.
In Victoria, the Labor-held seats of Burke and Hoddle were abolished, and the notionally Liberal seat of Bruce and the notionally Labor seat of Scullin were created. The Liberal-held seat of Corio became notionally Labor, while the Labor-held seats of Fawkner and Wannon became notionally Liberal.
The member for Burke, Edward Peters (Labor), contested Scullin.
The member for Gellibrand, Jack Mullens (Anti-Communist), contested Melbourne.
The member for Hoddle, Jack Cremean (Anti-Communist), contested Scullin.
The changes in Queensland did not result in any changes of party status.
In Western Australia, the notionally Labor seat of Stirling was created. The Labor-held seat of Swan became notionally Liberal.
The member for Swan, Harry Webb (Labor), contested Stirling.
In South Australia, the notionally Labor seat of Bonython was created. The Labor-held seat of Sturt became notionally Liberal.
The member for Sturt, Norman Makin (Labor), contested Bonython.
In Tasmania, the Liberal-held seat of Darwin was renamed Braddon.
The member for Darwin, Aubrey Luck (Liberal), contested Braddon.

Retiring Members and Senators

Labor
 Gordon Anderson MP (Kingsford-Smith, NSW)
 Arthur Greenup MP (Dalley, NSW)
 Don McLeod MP (Wannon, Vic)

Liberal
 Josiah Francis MP (Moreton, Qld)
 Jo Gullett MP (Henty, Vic)

Country
Senator George Rankin (Vic)

House of Representatives
Sitting members at the time of the election are shown in bold text. Successful candidates are highlighted in the relevant colour. Where there is possible confusion, an asterisk (*) is also used.

Australian Capital Territory

New South Wales

Northern Territory

Queensland

South Australia

Tasmania

Victoria

Western Australia

Senate
Sitting Senators are shown in bold text. Tickets that elected at least one Senator are highlighted in the relevant colour. Successful candidates are identified by an asterisk (*).

New South Wales
Five seats were up for election. The Labor Party was defending two seats. The Liberal-Country Coalition was defending three seats. Senators Stan Amour (Labor), Ken Anderson (Liberal), James Arnold (Labor), Donald Grant (Labor) and Alister McMullin (Liberal) were not up for re-election.

Queensland
Five seats were up for election. The Labor Party was defending two seats. The Liberal-Country Coalition was defending three seats. Senators Gordon Brown (Labor), Condon Byrne (Labor), Roy Kendall (Liberal), Ted Maher (Country) and Ian Wood (Liberal) were not up for re-election.

South Australia
Five seats were up for election. The Labor Party was defending two seats. The Liberal Party was defending three seats. Senators Jack Critchley (Labor), Keith Laught (Liberal), Rex Pearson (Liberal), John Ryan (Labor) and Jim Toohey (Labor) were not up for re-election.

Tasmania
Five seats were up for election. The Labor Party was defending one seat. The Liberal Party was defending four seats. Senators Bill Aylett (Labor), George Cole (Labor), John Marriott (Liberal), Justin O'Byrne (Labor) and Robert Wordsworth (Liberal) were not up for re-election.

Victoria
Five seats were up for election. The Labor Party was defending three seats. The Liberal-Country Coalition was defending two seats. Senators Jack Devlin (Labor), John Gorton (Liberal), Bert Hendrickson (Labor), Pat Kennelly (Labor) and Ivy Wedgwood (Liberal) were not up for re-election.

Western Australia
Five seats were up for election. The Labor Party was defending two seats. The Liberal Party was defending three seats (although Senator Agnes Robertson had defected to the Country Party). Senators Joe Cooke (Labor), James Fraser (Labor), John Harris (Labor), Malcolm Scott (Liberal) and Harrie Seward (Country) were not up for re-election.

Summary by party 

Beside each party is the number of seats contested by that party in the House of Representatives for each state, as well as an indication of whether the party contested Senate elections in each state.

See also
 1955 Australian federal election
 Members of the Australian House of Representatives, 1954–1955
 Members of the Australian House of Representatives, 1955–1958
 Members of the Australian Senate, 1953–1956
 Members of the Australian Senate, 1956–1959
 List of political parties in Australia

References
Adam Carr's Election Archive - House of Representatives 1955
Adam Carr's Election Archive - Senate 1955

1955 in Australia
Candidates for Australian federal elections